Paratophysis sericea is a species of beetle in the family Cerambycidae, and the only species in the genus Paratophysis. It was described by Gressitt and Rondon in 1970.

References

Dorcasominae
Beetles described in 1970
Monotypic beetle genera